Landmark Worldwide (known as Landmark Education before 2013), or simply Landmark, is a company, headquartered in San Francisco, that offers personal-development programs.

Landmark Education started in 1991 with the licensing of rights to use intellectual property owned by Werner Erhard, who had originated the est (Erhard Seminars Training) system in the 1970s. Landmark has developed and delivered multiple follow-up and additional programs. Its subsidiary, the Vanto Group, markets and delivers training and consulting to organizations.

History 
Landmark Education, founded in January 1991 by several of the presenters of a training program known as "the Forum", licensed the intellectual property rights to the Forum from Werner Erhard and Associates.
The new company offered similar courses and employed many of the same staff. The Forum was updated and reduced in length from four days to three, and this revised course, named "the Landmark Forum", has been further revised by Landmark's program leaders over the years.

According to Landmark, Werner Erhard (creator of the est training which ran from 1971 to 1984, when it was superseded by the Forum) consults from time to time with its research and design team.

The business traded as Landmark Education Corporation from May 1991. In June 2003 it was re-structured as Landmark Education LLC, and in July 2013 it was renamed Landmark Worldwide LLC.

Landmark has stated it never paid royalties to Erhard under the licensing agreement and that it purchased outright the intellectual property in the Forum and other courses by 2002.

Current operations

, Landmark Worldwide's core business operation is the delivery of seminars and training courses which aim to offer improvements in personal productivity, vitality, communication skills, and decision-making. Some of these are intensive two- or three-day courses. Landmark structures others as weekly three-hour seminars over a three-month period. The organization also advertises six- and twelve-month training programs in topics such as leadership, teamwork, and public speaking. Some of the courses require participants to start a community project, and those courses are structured to support them in the design and implementation of such projects.

Since March 2020 the company switched its operations to online delivery in webinar format, due to precautions in the light of the Covid pandemic. As restrictions have been eased, in-person events have been gradually reintroduced, and it is expected that in future there will be a mix of online and in-person courses offered.

Landmark Worldwide operates as an employee-owned for-profit private company. According to Landmark's website, its employees own all the stock of the corporation, with no individual holding more than 3%. The company states that it invests its surpluses into making its programs, initiatives, and services more widely available.

The company has reported  that more than 2.4 million people had participated in its programs since 1991. Landmark holds seminars in approximately 115 locations in more than 21 countries. Landmark's revenue surpassed $100 million in 2018, with profits of about $5 million, and had 500 employees as well as large numbers of volunteers who lead the training programs and assist with their production.

Business consulting

Vanto Group, Inc., founded in 1993 as Landmark Education Business Development (LEBD), a wholly owned subsidiary, uses the Landmark methodology to provide consulting services to businesses and to other organizations. The University of Southern California (USC) Marshall School of Business carried out a case study in 1998 into the work of LEBD with BHP New Zealand Steel. The report concluded that the set of interventions in the organization produced a 50% improvement in safety, a 15% to 20% reduction in key benchmark costs, a 50% increase in return on capital, and a 20% increase in raw steel production.
LEBD became the Vanto Group in 2008.

Companies such as Panda Express, and previously Lululemon Athletica, have paid for and encourage employees to take part in the Landmark Forum.

Organizations including Nasa, Apple, Microsoft, GlaxoSmithKline, Reebok, and Panda Express have employees who have participated in Landmark's programs through its corporate division, Vanto Group.

Landmark Forum 
Landmark's entry course, the Landmark Forum, is the default first course for new participants and provides the foundation of all Landmark's other programs. The Landmark Forum takes place over three consecutive days plus an evening session (generally Friday, Saturday, Sunday, and Tuesday evening.)  Forum attendance varies in size between 75 and 250 people.  Landmark arranges the course as a dialogue in which the Forum leader presents a series of proposals and encourages participants to take the floor to relate how those ideas apply to their own individual lives. Course leaders set up rules at the beginning of the program and Landmark strongly encourages participants not to miss any part of the program.
Attendees are also urged to be "coachable" and not just be observers during the course.

Various ideas are proposed for consideration and explored during the course. These include:

 There can be a big difference between what actually happened in a person's life and the meaning or interpretation they make up about it.
 Human behavior is governed by a perceived need to look good.
 People often pursue an "imaginary 'someday' of satisfaction". 
 People create meaning for themselves since "there is none inherent in the world". 
 When people have persistent complaints that are accompanied by unproductive fixed ways of being and acting, this can be "transformed" by a creative act of generating entirely new ways of being and acting, rather than by trying to change one's self in comparison to the past.

During the course, participants are encouraged to call friends and family members with whom they feel they have unresolved tensions,
and to take responsibility for their own behavior.

The evening session follows closely on the three consecutive days of the course and completes the Landmark Forum. During this final session, the participants share information about their results and bring guests to learn about the Forum.

Concepts 

Landmark emphasizes the idea that there is a difference between the facts of what happened in a situation, and the meaning, interpretation, or story about those facts. It proposes that people frequently confuse those facts with their own story about them, and, as a consequence, are less effective or experience suffering in their lives.

Meaning is something that human beings invent in language, Landmark suggests – it's not inherent in events themselves. Therefore, if people change what they say, they can alter the meaning they associate with events and be more effective in dealing with them.

Landmark suggests that as people see these invented meanings, they discover that much of what they had assumed to be their "identity" is actually just a limiting social construct that they had made up in conversations in response to events in the past. From this realization, participants in Landmark's programs create new perspectives for what they now see as possible. They are then trained in sharing these with family members, friends, and workmates, so that the new possibilities live in the social realm, rather than just in their own minds. In other words, Landmark suggests that the more one's social environment supports one's goals, the easier it will be to accomplish those goals. When Landmark uses the term "new possibilities", it does so differently from the everyday sense of something that might happen in the future, instead using it to refer to a present-moment opportunity to be and act differently, free from interpretations from the past.

Influence and impact 
The ideas found in Landmark's programs, as well as in those of Landmark's predecessor est, are identified by some writers as being among the most influential in the development of the modern coaching industry. 

After completing a Landmark program, Gavin Larkin started RUOK? Day, an Australian national  day of awareness about depression and suicide-prevention.

Landmark's "Self-Expression and Leadership Program" (SELP) requires participants to undertake a community project; some such undertakings have become nationally recognized.

Public reception and criticism

Academics' views 

Some scholars have categorized Landmark or its predecessor organizations as a "self religion" or a (broadly defined) "new religious movement" (NRM).

Others, such as George Chryssides, question some aspects of these characterizations.
Landmark maintains that it is an educational foundation and denies being a religious movement. Landmark has threatened or pursued lawsuits against people who call it a cult.

Reporters' opinions 

In his review of the Landmark Forum, New York Times reporter Henry Alford wrote that he "resented the pressure" placed on him during a session, but also noted that "two months after the Forum, I'd rate my success at 84 percent." Time reporter Nathan Thornburgh, in his review of The Landmark Forum, said "At its heart, the course was a withering series of scripted reality checks meant to show us how we have created nearly everything we see as a problem" and "I benefited tremendously from the uncomfortable mirror the course had put in front of me."

Amber Allison, writing in The Mayfair Magazine describes Landmark's instructors as "enthusiastic and inspiring". Her review says that after doing The Landmark Forum, "Work worries, relationship dramas all seem more manageable", and that she "let go of almost three decades of hurt, anger and feelings of betrayal" towards her father.

Journalist Amelia Hill with The Observer witnessed a Landmark Forum and concluded that, in her view, it is not religious or a cult. Hill wrote, "It is ... simple common sense delivered in an environment of startling intensity." Karin Badt from The Huffington Post criticized the organisation's emphasis on spreading the word' of the Landmark forum as a sign of the participants' 'integrity in recounting her personal experience of an introductory "Landmark Forum" course, but noted, "at the end of the day, I found the Forum innocuous. No cult, no radical religion: an inspiring, entertaining introduction of good solid techniques of self-reflection, with an appropriate emphasis on action and transformation (not change)".

Reporter Laura McClure with Mother Jones attended a three and a half-day forum, which she described as "My lost weekend with the trademark happy, bathroom-break hating, slightly spooky inheritors of est."

France 3 documentary 
In 2004, the French channel France 3 aired a television documentary on Landmark in their investigative series Pièces à Conviction. The episode, called "Voyage Au Pays des Nouveaux Gourous" ("Journey to the land of the new gurus") was highly critical of its subject.
Shot in large part with a hidden camera, it showed attendance at a Landmark course and a visit to Landmark offices. In addition, the program included interviews with former course participants, anti-cultists, and commentators. Landmark left France following the airing of the episode and a subsequent site visit by labor inspectors that noted the activities of volunteers, 
and sued Jean-Pierre Brard in 2004 following his appearance in the documentary.

The episode was uploaded to a variety of websites, and in October 2006 Landmark issued subpoenas pursuant to the Digital Millennium Copyright Act to Google Video, YouTube, and the Internet Archive demanding details of the identity of the person(s) who had uploaded those copies. These organizations challenged the subpoenas and the Electronic Frontier Foundation (EFF) became involved, planning to file a motion to quash Landmark's DMCA subpoena to Google Video. Landmark eventually withdrew its subpoenas.

See also 
 Applied Ontology
 Large-group awareness training
 List of large-group awareness training organizations

Footnotes

References 

;

External links 

1991 establishments in California
Companies based in San Francisco
Education companies established in 1991
Employee-owned companies of the United States
Werner Erhard
Large-group awareness training
Self religions
Training companies of the United States